A Cuban exile is a person who emigrated from Cuba in the Cuban exodus. Exiles have various differing experiences as emigrants depending on when they migrated during the exodus.

Demographics

Social class

Cuban exiles would come from various economic backgrounds, usually reflecting the emigration wave they were a part of. Many of the Cubans who would emigrate early were from the middle and upper class, but often brought very little with them when leaving Cuba. Small Cuban communities were formed in Miami and across the United States and populated with small Cuban owned businesses. By the Freedom Flights many emigrants were middle class or blue-collar workers, due to the Cuban government's restrictions on the emigration of skilled workers. Many exiled professionals were unlicensed outside Cuba and began offering their services in the informal economy. Cuban exiles also used Spanish language skills to open import-export businesses tied to Latin America. By the 1980s many Cuban exile-owned businesses would prosper and a thriving business community would develop. By the 1980 Mariel boatlift most new emigrants from Cuba were economic migrants typically leaving to escape the harsh prospects of the Cuban economy.

LGBT people

Between 1965 and 1968, the Cuban government interned LGBT people, along with others who would not or were not allowed to serve in the military, in labor camps called the Military Units to Aid Production. Outside the camps, discrimination against LGBT people was rampant in Cuban society; homosexuality would not be decriminalized until 1979. LGBT Cubans notably tried to escape the island either by enlisting in the Cuban military to be deployed abroad, or by emigrating in the Mariel boatlift where LGBTQ Cuban prisoners were specifically targeted by authorities to be given approval to emigrate.

The male exiles of the Mariel boatlift were depicted by the Castro administration as effeminate and often implied they were gay. Revolutionary masculinity (machismo) and an association of homosexuality with capitalism had fostered homophobic sentiments in Revolutionary Cuban culture. This atmosphere had driven many LGBTQ Cubans to flee when Castro announced he would allow the exodus. By 1980 homosexuality was no longer criminalized by Cuban law, but gays and lesbians still faced systemic discrimination. There was a social phenomenon of men pretending to be gay to pass the interviews required of applicants for the exodus, because it was believed that homosexuals were more likely to pass the panel held to determine if a person could exit from Cuba. Communities of gay exiles formed in the processing centers that formed for those applying for entry to the United States. These centers kept their gender populations segregated. As a result, a majority of reports of LGBTQ Cuban Exile communities in these centers were focused on gay male exiles. However, secondhand reports suggested parallel lesbian communities had formed in the women's population. Though United States law technically barred emigration into the country on grounds of homosexuality, exceptions were made for the exiles to support them as anti-communists. Only LGBTQ people who clearly and explicitly told the US immigration panel that they identified as such were denied entry to the United States.

Author Susana Pena has written about LGBT people in the Mariel boatlift and has speculated that their resettlement in Miami may have spurred on a revival of LGBT social life in Miami's South Beach.

Afro-Cubans 
Though the early waves of Cuban exiles were mainly Euro-Cubans, Afro-Cuban exiles became more common among the Mariel Boatlift and Balseros periods. Anywhere between 20% and 40% of Marielitos were identified as black. Afro-Cuban exiles from Cuba experienced a transition from the more racially integrated Cuban society, and found themselves split between a majority European Cuban exile community and a distrustful African American community. A substantial portion of Afro-Cuban exiles blended more into the African American community, but some are still tied to the Cuban community.

References

Cuban diaspora
Cuban expatriates